Spencer Whittaker (February 1871 – 16 April 1910) was an English footballer, manager and secretary.

Playing career
Whittaker played for hometown club Oswaldtwistle Rovers, before retiring from playing, taking up the chairman and secretary role at the club.

Managerial career
Whittaker was appointed manager of Burnley in 1903. His reign as Burnley manager was to come to a tragic end in April 1910. Whittaker was on his way to London by train to register the signing of a new player. When the train stopped in Crewe, it was reported that a man had fallen from a carriage some distance outside the town. When the body was discovered it was found to be that of Whittaker. The fall resulted in the death of the Burnley manager, and a benefit match against Manchester United at Turf Moor was arranged for Whittaker's wife and family.

Personal life
Whittaker's brother, Nat, was a professional footballer, manager, secretary and referee, refereeing the 1907 FA Cup Final.

References

External links
Burnley Football Club: 1903-1911

English footballers
People from Oswaldtwistle
English football managers
English football chairmen and investors
Burnley F.C. managers
1871 births
1910 deaths
Association football executives
Oswaldtwistle Rovers F.C. players
Association footballers not categorized by position